Iduda is an administrative ward in the Mbeya Urban district of the Mbeya Region of Tanzania in Africa. In 2016 the Tanzania National Bureau of Statistics report there were 4,582 people in the ward, from 4,157 in 2012.

Neighborhoods 
The ward has 4 neighborhoods.
 Kanda ya Chini
 Kanda ya Juu
 Kanda ya Kati
 Mwahala

References 

Wards of Mbeya Region